Fernander Kassaï (born 1 July 1987) is a Central African international footballer who last played for Romanian club Gaz Metan Mediaș

Career

Club
Born in Bimbo, Kassaï has played in France for Le Mans B, Rouen, Romorantin and Le Mans.

In June 2015, Kassaï moved to Irtysh Pavlodar on loan until the end of the 2015 season.

In December 2015, following a successful loan period in Kazakhstan, Slavia Sofia sold Kassaï to Tobol. On 15 December 2019, Tobol announced that Kassaï had left the club at the end of his contract.

In August 2020 he signed for Gaz Metan Mediaș.

International
Kassaï made his international debut for Central African Republic in 2010, and has appeared in FIFA World Cup qualifying matches.

Career statistics

Club

International

References

1987 births
Living people
People from Ombella-M'Poko
Association football central defenders
Central African Republic footballers
Central African Republic international footballers
SO Romorantin players
FC Rouen players
Le Mans FC players
Grenoble Foot 38 players
PFC Slavia Sofia players
FC Tobol players
CS Gaz Metan Mediaș players
Ligue 2 players
Liga I players
First Professional Football League (Bulgaria) players
Kazakhstan Premier League players
Expatriate footballers in Bulgaria
Expatriate footballers in Kazakhstan
Central African Republic expatriate footballers
Central African Republic expatriates in France
Expatriate footballers in France
Central African Republic expatriates in Bulgaria
Central African Republic expatriate sportspeople in Kazakhstan
Central African Republic expatriates in Romania
Expatriate footballers in Romania